José María Rosillo (born 15 May 1952) is a Spanish equestrian. He competed in the team jumping event at the 1976 Summer Olympics.

References

1952 births
Living people
Spanish male equestrians
Olympic equestrians of Spain
Equestrians at the 1976 Summer Olympics
Place of birth missing (living people)